The Dartmouth–New Hampshire rivalry is an intrastate college sports rivalry between the Dartmouth Big Green and New Hampshire Wildcats.

Basketball
Dartmouth and New Hampshire field the only two Division I college basketball teams in the Granite State. The Big Green and the Wildcats have met 70 times since 1908, with the teams tied at 35-35 in the series. Twenty-one of the 70 games have been decided by a single basket; 30 have been decided by two baskets or fewer. 

The two teams have played at least once every season since 1971, with the longest gap between games occurring between 1934 and 1952. The longest winning streak for either team in the 108-year history of the series is eight (Dartmouth, 1986 to 1992). Over the last quarter-century, however, New Hampshire has dominated the series, winning 17 of 25 games.

The most recent game in the series was won by New Hampshire, 70–56, at Lundholm Gym on December 30, 2019.

Game results

Football

Ice hockey
New Hampshire Wildcats men's ice hockey and Dartmouth Big Green men's ice hockey, the only Division I college hockey teams in New Hampshire, play once a year. The first game between the teams was played in 1970 at the Boston Garden. 

Beginning in 2004, the annual game has occasionally been played in Manchester; UNH leads in these neutral-site games, sponsored by RiverStone Resources of Manchester and billed as the "RiverStone Cup" series, 6–3.

Game results

References

College basketball rivalries in the United States
College ice hockey rivalries in the United States
Dartmouth Big Green
New Hampshire Wildcats
1901 establishments in New Hampshire